Osborne Park is a lakefront park located on the shore of Lake Erie in Willoughby, Ohio.  It  is the largest lakefront park in Willoughby and the only one with a swimming pool.  The pool features some of the tallest water slides in Lake County, Ohio.

References

Parks in Ohio
Protected areas of Lake County, Ohio